A monokaryon is a fungal mycelium or hypha in which each cell contains a single nucleus. It also refers to a mononuclear spore or cell of a fungus that produces a dikaryon in its life cycle.

See also
Dikaryon

References

Mycology